David Barron may refer to:

 David Barron (film producer) (born 1954), British film producer
 David Barron (footballer) (born 1987), Scottish footballer
 David J. Barron (born 1967), federal judge on the United States Court of Appeals for the First Circuit
 David W. Barron (1935–2012), British computer scientist
 David Barron (actor), American actor in the 1989 Broadway revival of Sweeney Todd
 David Barron (Highland games), American competitor at Highland games, including the Highlander Challenge World Championships
David Barron Corona (1963–1997), Mexican drug trafficker

See also 
 David Baron (disambiguation)